Arthur Joseph Griffin (born January 28, 1988) is an American former professional baseball pitcher. He played in Major League Baseball (MLB) for the Oakland Athletics and Texas Rangers.

Early life
Griffin attended Grossmont High School. He was named the pitcher and player of the year in his league during the 2006 season. Grossmont won the league championship. He was drafted by the Philadelphia Phillies in the 34th round in 2009, but he did not sign with the Phillies.

Professional career
Griffin was drafted by the Oakland Athletics in the 13th round of the 2010 Major League Baseball Draft out of the University of San Diego, where he played college baseball for the Toreros from 2007 to 2010.

Oakland Athletics

2012 season

Griffin made his major league debut on June 24, 2012 against the San Francisco Giants. He went 6 innings giving up 2 runs on 3 hits, striking out 4 and walking 1 in a no-decision. Griffin struck out Gregor Blanco looking for his first major league strikeout.

Griffin would wind up finishing the season with a record of 7-1 and an ERA of 3.06 in 15 starts for the A's.

Griffin pitched in the ALDS against the Detroit Tigers, pitching 5 innings of 2 run ball en route to a no-decision.

2013 season
Griffin made the A's opening day roster and started out as the fourth starter in the rotation. He won his first start of the 2013 season beating out the Seattle Mariners to tie the opening series of the season. Griffin pitched his first career shutout/complete game on June 26, defeating the Cincinnati Reds.

Griffin pitched 200 innings for the division winning A's, providing them with 32 starts and 14 wins in the process. He also led the league in home runs allowed with 36.

2014 season
Griffin began the season on the 60 Day DL with flexor tendinitis in his right elbow. On April 29, it was announced that Griffin would require Tommy John surgery and would miss the entire 2014 season.

2015 season
Griffin was placed on the 60-day disabled list to begin the 2015 season in an effort to continue recovery from last year's Tommy John surgery. He spent the entire year recovering once again after feeling soreness in his surgically repaired elbow. Towards the end of August, Griffin made his first appearance in almost 2 years, pitching in Class A. After making 2 starts, he got called up to AAA to finish the season. After 4 starts of recovery, Griffin didn't get called up by the A's. On November 20, Griffin was designated for assignment. He was released a few days later.

Texas Rangers
Griffin signed a minor league contract with the Texas Rangers on December 21, 2015. With Yu Darvish being out until May, the Rangers had one open spot in the rotation. Griffin won the job during Spring Training, and was slated as the 5th man in the rotation. Griffin had finally made his MLB return on April 8, 2016 against the Los Angeles Angels. He pitched 6 innings, allowing 3 runs on 6 hits and one strikeout as the Rangers won, 7–3, giving Griffin his first victory in more than two years.

New York Mets
On February 26, 2018, Griffin signed a minor league contract with an invite to spring training with the New York Mets. He was released on April 19.

Pitching style
Griffin throws four pitches: a four-seam fastball at 88–91 mph, a 12-6 curveball at 68–70, a cutter to right-handed hitters at 82–85, and a changeup to left-handers at 78–82.

References

External links

San Diego Toreros bio 

1988 births
Living people
American expatriate baseball players in Canada
Arizona League Athletics players
Baseball players from California
Burlington Bees players
Frisco RoughRiders players
Las Vegas 51s players
Major League Baseball pitchers
Midland RockHounds players
Nashville Sounds players
Oakland Athletics players
Round Rock Express players
Sacramento River Cats players
San Diego Toreros baseball players
Sportspeople from El Cajon, California
Stockton Ports players
Texas Rangers players
Vancouver Canadians players